Elections to Newham London Borough Council in London, England were held on 4 May 2006. The whole council, including the directly elected mayor, was up for election for the first time since the 2002 election. The Labour Party maintained control of the council.

Election result

|}

Background
A total of 237 candidates stood in the election for the 60 seats being contested across 20 wards. Candidates included a full slate from the Labour party (as had been the case at every election since the borough council had been formed in 1964), whilst the Conservative party also ran a full slate and the Liberal Democrats ran 10 candidates. Respect, running for the first time, also ran a full slate. Other candidates running were 12 Greens, 29 Christian Peoples Alliance, and 6 Independents.

Results by ward

Beckton

Boleyn

Canning Town North

Canning Town South

Custom House

East Ham Central

East Ham North

East Ham South

Forest Gate North

Forest Gate South

Green Street East

Green Street West

Little Ilford

Manor Park

Plaistow North

Plaistow South

Royal Docks

Stratford and New Town

Wall End

West Ham

By-elections between 2006 and 2010

Royal Docks

The by-election was called following the death of Cllr Simon P. Tucker.

References

2006
2006 London Borough council elections